A sweet pickle most commonly refers to a sweet-and-sour pickled cucumber.  It may also refer to:

 Any sweet-and-sour pickled food, see pickling
 Branston pickle, a trade name for similar chutney-like condiments
 Sweet Pickles, a series of children's books